Blacon High School, officially Blacon High School, A Specialist Sports College, is a coeducational secondary school located in Blacon in the English county of Cheshire.

As a foundation school, Blacon is administered by Cheshire West and Chester Council. The school moved into a new building in 2016 as part of the Priority Schools Building Programme.

Blacon High School offers GCSEs, BTECs and Cambridge Nationals as programmes of study for pupils. There are also some vocational courses available.

References

External links
Blacon High School official website

Secondary schools in Cheshire West and Chester
Foundation schools in Cheshire West and Chester
Specialist sports colleges in England